Sphaerium rivicola, the river orb mussel, is a species of freshwater bivalve from family Sphaeriidae.

Distribution
Its native distribution is European.

 Czech Republic – in Bohemia, in Moravia, endangered
 Germany – highly endangered (Stark gefährdet)

References

rivicola
Taxa named by Jean-Baptiste Lamarck
Bivalves described in 1818